Vishwanath Bondre (25 November 1936 – 8 January 2014) was an Indian cricketer. He played 28 first-class matches for Mumbai and Associated Cement Company between 1961 and 1972.

References

External links
 

1936 births
2014 deaths
Indian cricketers
Mumbai cricketers
Cricketers from Mumbai
Associated Cement Company cricketers